Sitkwin (BGN/PCGN: sitkwin) is a  small town in Minhla Township, Bago Region, of Myanmar.

Important events

February 7, 1998: Bertrand Piccard and Crew arrived with their Breitling Orbiter balloon. First, they got greeted by the Burmese army with gunfire to their balloon.

June 23, 2002: 4254 people from Sitkwin area got forced to rally against the National League for Democracy (NLD).

Notes

External links
 "Sitkwin Map — Satellite Images of Sitkwin" Maplandia World Gazetteer
 Sitkwin 

Populated places in Bago Region